The 3rd Jutra Awards were held on February 25, 2001 to honour films made with the participation of the Quebec film industry in 2000. The hosts of the ceremony were Yves Jacques and Élise Guilbault.

Winners and nominees

References

2001 in Quebec
Jutra
03
2000 in Canadian cinema